"The Fairest of the Fair" is a 1908 march by John Philip Sousa. One of Sousa's more melodic, less military marches, it was composed for the annual Boston Food Fair of 1908. It is claimed that the memory of a pretty girl he had seen at an earlier fair inspired the composition.

History
Sousa composed "The Fairest of the Fair" in 1908, intending the Sousa Band to perform it at the annual Boston Food Fair in the fall of that year. It is the only work of any kind that he composed that year and one of only a handful of compositions that he wrote between 1906 and 1910. He apparently completed it in New York during the summer, as the final page of the original score was signed "John Philip Sousa, Camp Comfort, Saranac Lake, Adirondack, New York, July 8, 1908."

Notes

External links
 The Fairest of the Fair, Dallas Wind Symphony
 Includes links to Sousa Band recording, sheet music from the Library of Congress, etc.
 Sousa Band 

Sousa marches
1908 compositions
American marches
Songs written by John Philip Sousa
Concert band pieces